Mayaro may refer to:
                           
 Mayaro, California, an unincorporated community in Butte County, California, U.S.
 Mayaro Bay, a bay on the east coast of the island of Trinidad
 Mayaro County, a group of villages in Trinidad and Tobago
 Mayaro, Trinidad, a town in Mayaro County
 Mayaro virus, a virus transmitted by the Haemagogus mosquito